This is a list of people who have served as Custos Rotulorum of Northumberland.

 Robert Horsley bef. 1547–?
 Sir Robert Brandling bef. 1558–1568
 Sir John Forster bef. 1573 – aft. 1594
 Ralph Eure, 3rd Baron Eure 1596–1598
 Sir Robert Carey 1598 – bef. 1605
 Edward Talbot, 8th Earl of Shrewsbury bef. 1605–1618
 Sir Ralph Delaval 1618–1628
 William Cavendish, 1st Earl of Newcastle 1628–1632
 Sir William Widdrington 1632–1646
 Interregnum
 William Widdrington, 2nd Baron Widdrington 1660–1675
 Henry Cavendish, 2nd Duke of Newcastle 1675–1688
 Richard Lumley, 1st Earl of Scarbrough 1689–1721
 Richard Lumley, 2nd Earl of Scarbrough 1722–1740
 Charles Bennet, 2nd Earl of Tankerville 1740–1753
 Hugh Percy, 1st Duke of Northumberland 1753–1786
 Hugh Percy, 2nd Duke of Northumberland 1786–1800
 William Cavendish-Bentinck, 3rd Duke of Portland 1800–1802
 Hugh Percy, 2nd Duke of Northumberland 1802–1817
For later custodes rotulorum, see Lord Lieutenant of Northumberland.

References
Institute of Historical Research - Custodes Rotulorum 1544-1646
Institute of Historical Research - Custodes Rotulorum 1660-1828

Northumberland